The 2021 Major League Soccer season was the 26th season of Major League Soccer (MLS), the top professional soccer league in the United States and Canada. The 2021 season included the addition of Austin FC as an expansion club, which took the league to 27 teams.

Due to the ongoing COVID-19 pandemic, the season was originally scheduled to begin on April 3, as opposed to the normal late February or early March start. This was later pushed back to April 16, the latest ever start to an MLS season, due to negotiations with the MLS Players Association for a new collective bargaining agreement. The regular season concluded on November 7. The 2021 MLS Cup Playoffs began on November 20, and concluded with MLS Cup 2021 on December 11.

At the beginning of the season, COVID-19 cross-border restrictions imposed by the Canadian government has also made the Canadian teams to play their home matches in the United States from the start of the season, while also sharing stadiums with other American MLS teams. On July 14, MLS announced that a select Toronto FC and CF Montréal matches would be played in Canada while working with the Canadian government on how the matches were to be held. Nearly a week later, the MLS announced that the Canadian teams would play home matches in Canada in August 2021.

The Columbus Crew were the defending champions, having defeated Seattle Sounders FC in MLS Cup 2020 but was eliminated from playoffs during the regular season, while the Philadelphia Union were the defending Supporters' Shield winners. The New England Revolution won their first Supporters' Shield, in the process breaking the record for most regular season points collected. New York City FC won their first ever MLS Cup, beating Portland Timbers in the decider.

Teams

Stadiums and locations

Personnel and sponsorship

Coaching changes

Regular season

Format
Each team played 34 matches, including 17 home games and 17 away games. Due to the difference in the number of teams in each conference, each conference had its own schedule construction format:
 All 14 Eastern Conference teams played six regional Eastern Conference opponents three times and the remaining seven Eastern Conference opponents twice. Each of them also played two cross conference games against different opponents.
 11 out of the 13 Western Conference teams played eight regional Western Conference opponents three times and the remaining four Western Conference opponents twice. Each of them also played two cross conference games against different opponents.
 The remaining two teams from the Western Conference played seven Western Conference opponents three times and the remaining five Western Conference opponents twice. Each of them also played three cross conference games against different opponents.

Tiebreakers

The tie-breaker was used in this order:
Points
Total wins
Total goal differential
Total goals scored
Fewer disciplinary points
Away goal differential
Away goals scored
Home goals differential
Home goals scored
Coin toss (2 clubs tied) or drawing of lots (≥3 clubs tied)

Disciplinary points were decided as follows:
Foul (1 point)
Technical area warning (2 points)
Yellow card (3 points)
Second yellow card (7 points)
Straight red card (7 points)
Coach dismissal (7 points)
Any supplemental discipline (8 points)

Conference standings

Eastern Conference

Western Conference

Overall table
The leading team in this table wins the Supporters' Shield.

Fixtures and results
All cross-conference matches are shown on the Eastern Conference table. In some cases, a team hosted another more than once; in this case, the first matchup is listed on top and the second is listed below.

Eastern Conference

Western Conference

MLS All-Star Game

Playoffs

Bracket

COVID-19 restrictions
From the start of the season, all Canadian teams played home matches behind closed doors at venues in a U.S. market (notwithstanding any local regulations otherwise allowing spectators) due to Canadian border restrictions.

On July 14, MLS announced that both CF Montreal and Toronto FC planned to return to playing matches at their home stadiums beginning July 17, citing new policies allowing vaccinated individuals to enter the country without 14 days self-isolation, provided that they test negative on a COVID-19 test. Unvaccinated individuals must still self-isolate, but a member of the MLS Players Association stated that nearly 95% of the league's player pool had been vaccinated, and Toronto FC manager Ali Curtis stated that all but two of their players were fully vaccinated. Toronto FC planned to admit 7,000 essential workers for the first match before expanding to 15,000 for subsequent matches, and CF Montreal planned to admit 5,000. However, Sportsnet reported that the plans had not yet been formally approved by the Public Health Agency of Canada, and that the Canadian government was expected to issue a statement on the matter.

Attendance

Average home attendances

Games without fans are not counted in averages or games played. Additionally, multiple games (above all the NYCFC games at Yankee Stadium) did not have their attendance listed and are also not counted in averages or games played.

Highest attendances 
Regular season

Player movement

The 2020 MLS Expansion Draft was held on December 15, 2020, at 10:00 am (EST).

Player statistics

Goals

Hat-tricks 

Notes
(H) – Home team(A) – Away team

Assists

Clean sheets

Awards

Player / Team of the Week
Bold denotes League Player of the Week.

Goal of the Week

Player of the Month

End-of-season awards

MLS Best XI

Notes

References

External links

 

 
Major League Soccer
Major League Soccer
Major League Soccer seasons
Major League Soccer